The following lists events that happened during 2007 in Vietnam.

Incumbents
Party General Secretary: Nông Đức Mạnh
President: Nguyễn Minh Triết 
Prime Minister: Nguyễn Tấn Dũng
Chairman of the National Assembly: Nguyễn Phú Trọng

Events

January
 January 25 - Vietnam's prime minister Nguyễn Tấn Dũng becomes the first leader of the communist nation to meet and hold talks with the head of the Roman Catholic Church. Prime Minister Dũng met Pope Benedict XVI at the Vatican in Rome.

 
2000s in Vietnam
Vietnam
Years of the 21st century in Vietnam
Vietnam